Arthur Cheney Train (September 6, 1875 – December 22, 1945), also called Arthur Chesney Train, was an American lawyer and writer of legal thrillers, particularly known for his novels of courtroom intrigue and the creation of the fictional lawyer Mr. Ephraim Tutt.

Early life
Train was born in Boston, Massachusetts on September 6, 1875. His father was lawyer Charles Russell Train, who served for many years as attorney general of Massachusetts, and his mother was Sara Maria Cheney. His much older half-brother was Rear Admiral Charles Jackson Train.

After attending St. Paul's School in Concord, New Hampshire, Train graduated with a BA from Harvard University in 1896 and LLB from Harvard Law School in 1899.

Career

In January 1901, Train became assistant in the office of the New York County District Attorney. In 1904 he started his literary career with the publication of the short story "The Maximilian Diamond" in Leslie's Monthly. He ran the two careers in parallel until 1908 when he left the District Attorney's office to open a general law practice in the Mutual Life Building at 34 Nassau Street in New York City. His 1907 novel, Mortmain, was one of the earliest works in the alien hand syndrome genre and was adapted into a 1915 film of the same name that is now lost. Several other works by Train were filmed, including Illusion (1929), His Children's Children (1923), and The Blind Goddess (1926).

From 1915 to 1922, Train was in private practice as a lawyer with Charles Albert Perkins while continuing to write, not just novels but short stories, plays, and journalism. In 1919, he created the popular character of Mr. Ephraim Tutt, a wily old lawyer who supported the common man and always had a trick up his sleeve to right the law's injustices.

Train wrote dozens of stories about Tutt in the Saturday Evening Post. The fictional Ephraim Tutt became "the best known lawyer in America," particularly after the appearance of Yankee Lawyer, an immensely popular book that purported to be Tutt's autobiography. Train also coauthored two science fiction novels with eminent physicist Robert W. Wood. After 1922, he devoted himself to writing.

Personal life
In 1897, Train married Ethel Kissam (1876–1923). Ethel was the daughter of Benjamin Kissam and Lucy (née Warren) Kissam, the niece of Maria (née Kissam) Vanderbilt and the first cousin of William, Cornelius, Margaret, Emily, Florence, Frederick, Eliza, and George Washington Vanderbilt II. Together, they had four children, including Arthur Kissam Train.

Ethel died in 1923 and Train married Helen Coster Gerard in 1926, with whom he had one child John Train.

Train died on December 22, 1945, in New York City.

Bibliography 

Train, A. C. (1918). The Earthquake. New York: Charles Scribner's Sons. Describes the shock to ordinary life following America's entry into the First World War.

Train, A. C. (1919). By Advice of Counsel (2nd. Mr. Tutt novel). The Curtis Publishing Co. 
 
 
Train, A. C. (1920). The Hermit Of Turkey Hollow. (3rd. Mr. Tutt novel) The Curtis Publishing Co. 

Train, A. C. (1924). The Needle's Eye. New York: Charles Scribner's Sons.
Train, A. C. (1925). The Blind Goddess. New York: Charles Scribner's Sons.

References
Notes

External links

 
 
 
 

1875 births
1945 deaths
St. Paul's School (New Hampshire) alumni
Harvard Law School alumni
20th-century American novelists
American male novelists
American science fiction writers
American thriller writers
Fiction about law
New York (state) lawyers
Writers from Boston
Novelists from New York (state)
20th-century American male writers
Novelists from Massachusetts
Harvard College alumni